The kroon (sign: KR; code: EEK) was the official currency of Estonia for two periods in history: 1928–1940 and 1992–2011. Between 1 January and 14 January 2011, the kroon circulated together with the euro, after which the euro became the sole legal tender in Estonia. The kroon was subdivided into 100 cents (senti; singular sent).

The word kroon (“crown”) is related to that of the Nordic currencies (such as the Swedish krona and the Danish and Norwegian krone) and derived from the Latin word corona ("crown"). The kroon succeeded the mark in 1928 and was in use until the Soviet invasion in 1940 and Estonia's subsequent incorporation into the Soviet Union when it was replaced by the Soviet ruble. After Estonia regained its independence, the kroon was reintroduced in 1992 and replaced by the euro in 2011.

First kroon, 1928–1940

History
The kroon became the currency of Estonia on 1 September 1928 after having been a unit of account since 1924. It replaced the mark at a rate of 100 marks = 1 kroon. The kroon was subdivided into 100 senti.

In 1924, the kroon was pegged to the Swedish krona at par, with a gold standard of 2,480 KR = 1 kilogram of pure gold. The standard received real coverage with the reserves backing the kroon. The issue of treasury notes and exchange notes was terminated. In order to secure the credibility of the kroon, the Bank of Estonia exchanged kroon for foreign currency. All these measures restored confidence in the domestic banking and monetary sector, contributing to the economic reinvigoration of the country and to the improvement of the reputation of the Estonian state in the international arena.

During the Great Depression in 1933, the kroon went off the gold standard, devalued 35% and obtained a currency peg with sterling at £1 stg = 18.35 KR. The Estonian kroon kept this peg and circulated until the Soviet occupation of 1940. The kroon was exchanged for the Soviet rouble at a rate of 1 Rbl = 0.8 KR.

Banknotes and coins
In 1928, the first coins of this currency were issued, nickel-bronze 25 senti pieces. These were followed by bronze 1 sent in 1929, silver 2 krooni in 1930, bronze 5 senti and nickel-bronze 10 senti in 1931, silver 1 kroon in 1933, bronze 2 senti and aluminium-bronze 1 kroon in 1934, nickel-bronze 20 senti in 1935, nickel-bronze 50 senti in 1936.

On 25 July 1940, 4 days after the founding of the Estonian SSR, the last Estonian pre-WW II coin, the new 1 sent (date 1939), was issued.

In 1927, before the kroon was officially introduced, 100 mark banknotes circulated overprinted as "ÜKS KROON" (1 kroon). Eesti Pank introduced 10 krooni notes in 1928, followed by 5 KR and 50 KR in 1929, 20 KR in 1932 and 100 KR in 1935.

Second kroon, 1992–2010

History
The kroon was reintroduced as Estonia's currency on 20 June 1992, replacing the Soviet rouble at a rate of 1 KR = 10 Rbls. (Each person was able to change a maximum of 1,500 Rbls to 150 KR.) Initially, the Estonian kroon was pegged to the Deutsche Mark at a rate of 8 KR = DM 1. After the introduction of the euro the fixed exchange rate of DM 1.95583 to the euro led to an exchange rate of 15.64664 KR to the euro. On 28 June 2004, as Estonia joined the ERM II-system, the central parity of the Estonian kroon was revalued (by less than 0.001%) to 15.6466 KR per euro. On 1 January 2011 the euro replaced the kroon as the official currency of Estonia. The kroon circulated alongside the euro until 15 January 2011 at which point it ceased to be legal tender. However, the Eesti Pank will indefinitely exchange kroon banknotes and coins in any amount into euro.

Banknotes
In 1992, banknotes were introduced in denominations of 1, 2, 5, 10, 25, 100, and 500 krooni. Some of the 5, 10, 25, 100, and 500 krooni notes were dated 1991. In 1994, a 50 KR note was introduced. Unlike others, the 1 KR and 50 KR notes were issued only once.

Notes in circulation before being replaced by the euro:
1 KR (1992),
2 KR (1992, 2006, 2007),
5 KR (1991, 1992, 1994),
10 KR (1991, 1992, 1994, 2006, 2007),
25 KR (1991, 1992, 2002, 2007),
50 KR (1994),
100 KR (1991, 1992, 1994, 1999, 2007),
500 KR (1991, 1994, 1996, 2000, 2007).

Coins

In 1992, coins were introduced (some dated 1991) in denominations of 5, 10, 20, & 50 senti, as well as 1 KR. The 1 KR was struck in cupronickel, the others in aluminum-bronze. However, in 1997, nickel-plated steel 20 senti were introduced, followed by aluminum-bronze 1 KR in 1998. 5 senti coins were not issued after 1994 but were still legal tender. The cupronickel 1 KR coins from 1992, 1993 and 1995 were demonetized on 31 May 1998 because they were too similar in weight and composition to DM 1 coins, and new 1 KR coins were issued. The 5 KR coins were commemorative pieces and were rarely seen in circulation.

Coins in circulation before being replaced by the euro:
5 senti (1991, 1992, 1995)
10 senti (1991, 1992, 1994, 1996, 1997, 1998, 2002, 2006, 2008)
20 senti (1992, 1996, 1997, 1999, 2003, 2004, 2006, 2008)
50 senti (1992, 2004, 2006, 2007)
1 kroon (1992, 1993, 1995, 1998, 2000, 2001, 2003, 2006, 2008)
5 krooni (1993, 1994).

See also

 Currency board
 Economy of Estonia
 Estonian euro coins
 Estonian mark

References

External links 

 The Estonian banknotes 

Currencies of Europe
Currencies replaced by the euro
Currencies of Estonia
Economic history of Estonia
Modern obsolete currencies
1928 establishments in Estonia
1940 disestablishments in Estonia
1992 establishments in Estonia
2011 disestablishments in Estonia